The British Citizen Award (BCA) is a recognition programme (The People's Honours) which is held bi-annually in the United Kingdom for individuals doing extraordinary work in their local community. The People's Honours was founded in September 2012. The medal presentation takes place in January and July each year at the Palace of Westminster hosted by The Rt. Hon. Lord Dholakia. In order to honour young people who are aged 18 and under who are also doing extraordinary work in their community, The British Citizen Youth Award was launched. The award ceremony for the BCyA also takes place at The Palace of Westminster annually in October each year.

Patrons
Mary Perkins
Lord Dholakia
Bradley Walsh

Nominations
Individuals are nominated for The British Citizen Award provided that they have had a meaningful impact on their community. Nominees come from all across the UK, all cultural backgrounds, and from all sectors of the community.

Nominations are free and all successful applicants are invited to a presentation day at the Palace of Westminster in London. Those who receive a BCA will be encouraged to use the post nominal after their name, thus enabling them to promote their achievement in perpetuity.

Nominations will require validation, the first level of which is the seconding of all individual submissions. The BCA Independent Assessment Panel will then require evidence that the achievements, commitment and dedication outlined in the application form has brought benefit to any given community or group. Finally the panel will need to ratify the application before an award will be made. The robust process ensures that the award becomes meaningful, sought-after and long-lasting.

Categories
Each award is made in its own category. There's currently 8 categories:
BCAa  -  for Service to Arts
BCAb  -  for Service to Business
BCAc  -  for Service to the Community
BCAe  -  for Service to Education
BCAh  -  for Service to Healthcare
BCAi  -  for Service to Industry
BCAo  -  for International Achievement
BCAv  -  for Volunteering & Charitable Giving

BCA Honours
Roll of Honours July 2021: 
Martin Turner, BCAc
Maggie Short, BCAe
Ragasudha Rani Vinjamuri, BCAa
Marion Baker, BCAh
Nick Barnes, BCAe
Robert James, BCAv
Lianne Havell, BCA
Marcelle Porteous, BCAv
Xavier Wiggins, BCAc
Craig Wellstead, BCAc
Cormac Van Der Hoeven, BCAc
Tony Lopes, BCAc
David Rowles, BCAv
Rachel Mason, BCAa
Stuart Smith, BCAc
Andrew Palazon, BCAc
Richard Andersone, BCAv
Joan Halkett, BCAe
Pam Ashmore, BCAv
Elaine Powell, BCAh
Ross Hockham, BCAe
Saira Begum Mir, BCAc
Suzanne Smith, BCAv
Janet Sayers, BCAv
Idris Patel, BCAc
Anwar Khattak, BCAc

Roll of Honours January 2021: 
Alan Bell BCAe
Alexander Anderson BCAv
Alia Jones BCAc
Anthony Kelly BCAh
Barrie de Suys BCAv
Claire Furness BCAe
Dennis Gowans BCAv
Graham Dodds BCAc
Preeti Kaur BCAv
Helen Mackenzie BCAc
Jonathan Hindley BCAv
Joyce Porter BCAv
Khalid Raza BCAo
Louise Channon BCAv
Mansoor Ahmad BCAv
Michael Scott BCAc
Mohammed Nadeem BCAc
Mukesh Malhotra  BCAv
Paul Browning BCAh
Rofikul Islam BCAc
Sally Miller BCAc
Sarah Gardner BCAv
Sharon Warboys BCAc
Sharon Knott BCAc
Stephen Wyatt BCAc
Timothy Baker BCAa
Tracie Pal BCAc

Roll of Honours January 2020: 
Adedayo Olowsale, BCAc
Ally Eloise, BCAv
Barbara Williams, BCAc
Ben Forbes, BCAc
Bevan Johns, BCAv
Carolyn Cross, BCAv
Coral Kelham, BCAc
David Facey, BCAv
David Gentry, BCAe
Dr Nooralhaq Nasimi, BCAc
Jackie Cooper, BCAv
Jamie McDonald, BCAv
Jim Montgomerie, BCAv
Jonathan Dalton, BCAc
Kim Hughes, BCAv
Laura Dunion, BCAv
Leah Chowdhry, BCAv
Lindsey Wilmshurst, BCAh
Lorraine & Lee Lewis, BCAh
Maureen Collins, BCAc
Mervin Sharp, BCAv
Michael Brown, BCAc
Michael Douglass, BCAh
Michelle Southern, BCAv
Nic Williams, BCAc
Paul England, BCAv
Paul Townsend, BCAv
Salma Bi, BCAe
Scott Fitzsimmons, BCAv
Steve Whiteway, BCAc
Vinod Patel, BCAc

Roll of Honours July 2019: 
Sayd Ahmed, BCAhon
Emma Rigby, BCAhon
Paul Atwal-Brice, BCAc
Tony Nisbet, BCAv
Frank McGowan, BCAv
Brett Townsley, BCAc
Christine Reid, BCAv
Carol Darby, BCAa
Ron Darby, BCAa
Dennis Jones, BCAc
Nora Bryan, BCAe
Suzanne Fernando, BCAh
Shwetal Shah, BCAhon
Dave McPartlin, BCAe
Elaine McCarthy, BCAc
Nahim Ahmed, BCAa
Caroline Bestwick, BCAh
Corinne Hutton, BCAc
Dwain Longley, BCAh
Siobhan Fennell, BCAc
Sean Molino, BCAh
Lauren Doherty, BCAv
Adrian Ducker, BCAc
Dr. Bill Webster, BCAh
Alex Eades, BCAv
Leigh Yates, BCAe
Karen Schurer, BCAv
Joan Briglin, BCAc
Neil Parsons, BCAc
Deborah Slator, BCAv
Will Harris, BCAv
Henderson Moore, BCAc
Molly Bird, BCAv
Margaret Woolhouse, BCAc
Tony Foulds, BCAc

Roll of Honours January 2019: 
Andrew Willis, BCAv
Valerie Gwynne, BCAv
Cliff Van Tonder, BCAa
David Wood, BCAv
Bridget Biddlecombe, BCAc
Paul Biddlecombe, BCAc
Ian Wilson, BCAh
Deborah Hedderwick, BCAa
Stephen Howard, BCAc
Kevin Byrne, BCAb
Ahmad Nawaz, BCAhon
Dr. Harjinder Kaur, BCAe
Brian Jones, BCAe
Ella Marsden, BCAv
Peter Ryan, BCAc
Daniel Lawrence, BCAc
Marianne Cash, BCAc
Julian Cash, BCAc
Nazim Ali, BCAc
Isobel Lafferty, BCAc
Pamela Corrigan, BCAv
Natasha Krywald, BCAv
Robert McCarthy, BCAv
Keith Davies, BCAv
Prof. Roman Hovorka, BCAh
Linda Kirk, BCAh
Haroon Mahmood, BCAh
Rhona Innes, BCAh
Dr. Nihara Krause, BCAh
Timothy Evers, BCAh

Roll of Honours July 2018: 
Terence Yates, BCAc
Billy Birch, BCAv
Jeanette Lowe, BCAc
Benjamin Carpenter, BCAe
Joyce Obaseki, BCAc
Bruce Ferguson, BCAc
Ronald Charles Mills, BCAe
Naveen Arles, BCAa
Reece Ryan, BCAv
Caitlin Jones, BCAv
Dr. Asher Lewinsohn, BCAh
John Anderson, BCAc
Sharron Hardwick, BCAo
Jonathan David Dixon, BCAv
Lily Blewitt, BCAc
Lisa Oguntoyinbo, BCAv
Les Newington, BCAv
Judith Wood, BCAh
Carlos Dennis, BCAv
Chrisetta Mitchell, BCAv
Lauraine Cheesman, BCAc
Douglas Thomas, BCAc
Hyung Dal Kim, BCAc
Chris Ross, BCAv
Marie O’Brien, BCAa
Lynne Misner, BCAc
Muhammad Ahmad, BCAc
Yvonne Limbrick, BCAe
Amanda Conner, BCAb

Roll of Honours January 2018: 
Dr. Abdullah Kraam, BCAh
Ann-Marie Lyons-Mummery, BCAc
Anthony Ebbutt, BCAv
Chris Clark, BCAe
David Evans, BCAo
Dr. Peter Minto, BCAe
David Wase, BCAv
Dr. Diahanne Rhiney, BCAe
Eric Green, BCAc
Irene Hicks, BCAv
Jane Gould-Smith, BCAi
Jennifer Gill, BCAv
Moawia Bin-Sufyan, BCAe
John McGorman, BCAv
John Newell, BCAv
Joy Hudson, BCAc
John Hudson, BCAc
Kojo Marfo, BCAa
LeighAnne Wright, BCAv
Lynda Smith, BCAh
Margaret McCrirrick, BCAv
Mark Jones, BCAc
Nick Antill-Holmes, BCAc
Nigel Davidson, BCAv
Joan Ward, BCAc
Qaiser Niazi, BCAc
Saba Nasim, BCAv
Shani Shamah, BCAv
Sheila Hanson, BCAc
David Hanson, BCAc
David Holby-Wolinski, BCAc
Steven Walker, BCAv
Sue Lockwood, BCAe
Toby Freeman, BCAh
Walter Innes, BCAc
Wayne Knowles, BCAc

Roll of Honours July 2017: 
Dr. Donald Mackenzie, BCAc
Chris Morrison, BCAo
Kelly Waite, BCAc
Jagraj Poselay, BCAc
Ben Haggarty, BCAa
Fiona Coldron, BCAc
Daphne Sharp, BCAc
Elaine Dunlop, BCAc
Steven Makin, BCAe
Susan Rutherford, BCAv
Clive Daniels, BCAv
Kelvin Smith, BCAv
Dr. Farnaaz Sharief, BCAh
Adrian Walker, BCAo
Andrew Baker, BCAv
Raymond Cannings, BCAv
Fiona Southern, BCAc
Steve Whitmore, BCAv
Nishall Garala, BCAc
Gillia Williamson, BCAv
Michelle Mulholland, BCAv
Alan Faulds, BCAc
Scott Wilson, BCAc
Doreen Duke, BCAc
Andrew Clarke-Coates, BCAh
Mary Beard, BCAc
Sheila Foster, BCAc
Anthony Paul Holding, BCAc
Mary Taggart, BCAc
David Campbell, BCAe
Lorraine Sass, BCAe

Roll of Honours January 2017: 
Gwen Gray, BCAc
Linda McLeod, BCAv
Adam Black, BCAe
Richard Chalmers, BCAc
Les Heyhoe, BCAv
Martha Lester-Cribb, BCAc
Sandy Kerr, BCAc
Denise Fergus, BCAc
Ray Matthews, BCAc
Julie Hill, BCAv
Clive Horton-Stephens, BCAc
Agnes Forde, BCAc
Beryl Parker, BCAv
John Holden, BCAa
Pauline Holden, BCAa
Janis Thomson, BCAc
Marion Strudwick, BCAe
Kevin Healey, BCAv
Mohammed Saddique, BCAv
Christine Higgott, BCAa
Steve Mee, BCAc
Dr. Joseph Waas, BCAh
Janet Perce, BCAc
Fred Holland, BCAh
Bamidele Adeoye, BCAc
Rita Piller, BCAv
Shane Yerrell, BCAc
Avis Fawcitt, BCAa

Roll of Honours July 2016: 
Max Morris, BCAv
Jeanette Marshall, BCAc
Kenny Marshall, BCAc 
Barbara Craig, BCAh
Stanley Taylor, BCAc
David Atkinson, BCAe
Charles Hustwayte, BCAc
Cintra Bainbridge, BCAv
Audrey Tibbles, BCAv
Mohammed Amran, BCAc
Kim Douglas, BCAh
Christine Connell, BCAc
Doreen Mitchell, BCAc 
Amanda Root, BCAa
Tim Low, BCAe
Sharron Macdonald, BCAe 
Eileen Galling, BCAc
Torron-Lee Dewar, BCAa
Irene Calcutt, BCAh 
Richard Field, BCAc
Michael Bates, BCAc
Frances Kelly, BCAa 
Brian Linnegar, BCAv
Jonathan Andrews, BCAb
Nigel Blair-Park, BCAh
Karen Thistlethwaite, BCAv
Julie Bell, BCAc
Zoe Clark-Coates, BCAh
Rosemary Hutton, BCAa 
Simon Headley, BCAv 
Sajid Rashid, BCAc 
Courtney Hughes, BCAv
Dr. Mark Sims, BCAv 
Ethan Evans, BCAy

Roll of Honours January 2016: 
Andrew Davies, BCAe
Mayoor Patel, BCAo
Mohammed Zafran, BCAc
Charles Claydon, BCAh
Anthony Gowing, BCAh
Nancy Kilburn, BCAv
Tony Eaton, BCAv
Stella Hayes, BCAv
Raymond Collins, BCAc
Trevor Gilbert, BCAb
Lawrence Lockhart, BCAe
Josephine Wylie, BCAc
Sylvia Morris, BCAh
Joyce Foxall, BCAv
Professor Gerald Russell, BCAh
Julie Lankshear, BCAv & Sue Dennett, BCAv
Harrison Nash, BCAo
Sarah Hynds, BCAc
Elspeth Baecke, BCAo
James Ewins, BCAo
Barbara Boyes, BCAc
Elizabeth Jackson, BCAc
Alan Nethercott, BCAv
John Young, BCAc
Ken Floyde, BCAc
Paula Maguire, BCAv & Robert Maguire, BCAv
Andy Jackson, BCAv
Mavis Nye, BCAh
Alison Kinge, BCAv
Emily Palmer, BCAv
Fred Sirieix, BCAc

Roll of Honours July 2015: 
Jane Newton, BCAc
Heather Jones, BCAe
Daniel O’Brien, BCAc
Max Levitas, BCAc
George Geraghty, BCAc
Mark and Nicola Tipping, BCAv
Gordon Badenoch, BCAv
Elizabeth Parker, BCAo
Kenneth Gardner, BCAa
Joyce Rothschild, BCAv
Kwong Ngan, BCAc
Patsy Elliott, BCAv
Christopher Colledge, BCAc
Stuart Russell, BCAa
David Hardy, BCAc
Mary Rae, BCAa
Brian and Mary Kay, BCAv
Patricia Caffrey, BCAv
Nicola Stevens, BCAo
David Westley, BCAc
Barbara Ruby Quartey, BCAe
John Fahey, BCAv
Ashley Jones, BCAc
Graham Penness, BCAc
Rosa Macpherson, BCAv
Maureen Brass, BCAa
Chantal Lockey, BCAh
Martin Wyatt, BCAa
Jodie Vasquez, BCAv
Monica Russell, BCAv
Roll of Honours January 2015: 
Simon Albert, BCAb
John Anderson, BCAv
Susan Bates, BCAv
Dr. Ashok Bhuvanagiri, BCAc
Shane Board, BCAv
Evelyn Buckland, BCAc
Charles Callaghan, BCAv
Donald Franks, BCAv
Claire Guest, BCAh
Lynda Gwyther, BCAe
Pauline Holman, BCAv
Audrey Johnson, BCAv 
Capt. Tristan Loraine, BCAi
Tracy Maher, BCAc
Harvey Mcsloy, BCAv
Irene Moore, BCAc
Primrose Kaur Panglea, BCAc
Arun Vaghjibhai Patel, BCAh
Linda Ann Phillips, BCAc
Howell Briscoe Rowlands, BCAc
Dorothy Rundle, BCAo
Darran Saunders, BCAc
Courtney Saunders-Jones, BCAc
Caroline Shearer, BCAc
John Shufflebottom, BCAv
Tommy Whitelaw, BCAh
Rick Wilson, BCAh
Dr. Ann-Marie Wilson, BCAo

BCyA Honours
Roll of Honours October 2021:
Maya Chiva Shah, BCyA
Jack Hopkins, BCyA
Samuel Gascoyne, BCyA
Antony Hudgell, BCyA
Milana Berhe, BCyA
Amol Neupane, BCyA
Millie Tammaro, BCyA
Samir Mazumder, BCyA
Lamissah La-Shontae Bhatti, BCyA
Freya Thakral, BCyA
Milan Paul Kumar, BCyA
Carlos-Ricardo Luis Foster-Gomes, BCyA
William Sears, BCyA
Isabella Evans, BCyA
Roxana-Andreea Tuinea-Bobe, BCyA
Molly May, BCyA
Jago Wickett, BCyA
Millie Gould, BCyA
George Ralphs, BCyA
Taylor Ashe, BCyA
Gethyn Dixon, BCyA
Olivia Eaton, BCyA
Beth Stephenson, BCyA

Roll of Honours October 2020: 
Monty Lord, BCyA
Joshua Forster, BCyA
Joseph Thompson, BCyA
Henry Howarth, BCyA
Katie Bradbeer, BCyA
Chloe Rollitt, BCyA
Michael Prentice, BCyA
Hollie-Grace Gough, BCyA
Ava Prisk, BCyA
Jack Yates, BCyA
Lily Yates, BCyA
Ruby Lockey-Pope, BCyA
Daniel Lloyd, BCyA
Krish Zagorski-Shah, BCyA
Rohan Zagorski-Shah, BCyA
Anokhi Zagorski-Shah, BCyA
Lauren Lazard, BCyA 
Faith Clotworthy, BCyA
Joseph Bartlett, BCyA
Kane Roker, BCyA
Charlotte Berry, BCyA
Sahil Usman, BCyA
Ciaren Adam, BCyA
Christopher Johnson, BCyA
Francis Cantlow, BCyA

Roll of Honours October 2019: 
Aidan Henderson, BCyA
Amy Barbour, BCyA
Andrew Lunn BCyA
James Lunn, BCyA
Marcus Weston, BCyA
Chloe Blanchfeld, BCyA
Evie Toombes, BCyA
Ben Godsell, BCyA
Ellie Toth, BCyA
Freddie Clark, BCyA
Sam McGhee, BCyA
Daniel Bubb, BCyA
Matthew Bubb, BCyA
Charlie Matthews, BCyA
Georgina Bearder, BCyA
Benjamin Harbottle, BCyA
Amy Roberts, BCyA
Nicole Kessy, BCyA
Harry Steel, BCyA
Olivia Hancock, BCyA
Isaac Mendelsohn, BCyA
Joey Tildesley-Devine, BCyA
Nathan Halford, BCyA
Jack Thompson, BCyA
Marcus Wilton, BCyA
Sir John Heron School, HON

Roll of Honours October 2018: 
Alex Yates, BCyA
Olivia Hart, BCyA
Nicholas Nikiforou, BCyA
Tallulah Deeks, BCyA
Jake Cathcart, BCyA
Nicole Kalungwishi-Hines, BCyA
Courtney Powdrill, BCyA
Tyler Ford, BCyA
Kiaragh Brown, BCyA
Jake Glennon, BCyA
Millie Nabarro, BCyA
Ben Mooney, BCyA
Bethany Groves, BCyA
Georgie Cavanagh, BCyA
Ishwar Sharma, BCyA
Hannah Chowdhry, BCyA
Jonathon Dawes, BCyA
Katlyn Wilson, BCyA
Jordan Havell, BCyA
Ruben Evans-Guillen, BCyA
Elena Evans-Guillen, BCyA
Iggy Just, BCyA
Siena Castallon, BCyA

Roll of Honours October 2017: 
Mia Goleniowska, BCyA
Natalie Goleniowska, BCyA
Junior Frood, BCyA
Bethan Owen, BCyA
Benjamin Wilson-Mayor, BCyA
Aidan Jackson, BCyA
Emily Lindley, BCyA
Jake Mendelsohn, BCyA
Chanel Murrish, BCyA
Owen Perks, BCyA
Molly Fraser, BCyA
Caine Wildman, BCyA
Aled Griffiths, BCyA
Grace Warnock, BCyA
Ted McCaffery, BCyA
Bailey Matthews, BCyA
Phoebe Maddison, BCyA
Gracie Howarth, BCyA
Madeleine Barnsley, BCyA
Cody McManus, BCyA
Amelia Butterfield, BCyA
Ellie Payne, BCyA
Jenny Cook, BCyA
Erin Spray, BCyA 

Roll of Honours October 2016: 
Jonjo Heuerman, BCyA
Louis Johnson, BCyA
Luke Chapman, BCyA
Bethan Rees, BCyA
Honey Jones, BCyA
Jennifer Brown, BCyA
Elly Neville, BCyA
Oliver Gatenby, BCyA
Esme Clark-Coates, BCyA
Bronte Clark-Coates, BCyA
Keira Beeson, BCyA
Sophie Fraser, BCyA
Ryan Wiggins, BCyA
Ashley Palipana, BCyA
Lyndsey Engelbrecht, BCyA
Millie Turner, BCyA
A’Mari Carribon, BCyA
Joab Price, BCyA
Emma whittaker, BCyA
James Whittaker, BCyA

References

https://www.independent.co.uk/news/the-british-citizen-awards-are-returning-for-a-second-year-10162891.html
http://www.bbc.co.uk/programmes/p02n2xrr

External links

Annual events in the United Kingdom
Awards established in 2015
British awards
2015 establishments in the United Kingdom